The 12028 / 12027 Krantivira Sangolli Rayanna Bengaluru Station–Puratchi Thalaivar Dr. M.G. Ramachandran Central Railway Station Shatabdi Express is a Superfast Express train of Shatabdi class belonging to Indian Railways that runs between Krantivira Sangolli Rayanna Bengaluru Station and Puratchi Thalaivar Dr. M.G. Ramachandran Central railway station via Vellore Katpadi Junction  in India. It is a 6 days a week service with Tuesdays being the weekly day off. It operates as train number 12028 from Krantivira Sangolli Rayanna Bengaluru station to Puratchi Thalaivar Dr. M.G. Ramachandran Central railway station and as train number 12027 in the reverse direction.

Coaches

Krantivira Sangolli Rayanna Bengaluru Station–Puratchi Thalaivar Dr. M.G. Ramachandran Central Railway Station Shatabdi Express generally has 1 Executive Chair Car coach, 11 AC Chair Car coaches and 2 luggage cum generator coaches. The train runs with the Linke-Hofmann Busch (LHB) coaches. As customary, the composition of coaches is at the discretion of Indian Railways. There is no pantry car but catering is arranged on board the train.

The coaches in Light blue color indicate AC Chair Cars and the coaches in Violet color indicate Executive Chair Cars.

Service

This train and Chennai Central–Mysuru Shatabdi Express are two fastest trains on the Bangalore–Chennai sector (both may not be equal). As per Bangalore (Bengaluru) Division Map on South Western Railway website, it covers the distance of 355.900 kilometres (chargeable distance 362 km - maybe due to higher maintenance cost for topography with higher gradients. The difference of real and chargeable distance is due to the difference between Jolarpettai and Mulanur by comparing the distance written in trains schedule of this part and the distance written in Bangalore or Bengaluru Division Map on South Western Railway website). It covers the distance in around 4 hours 55 mins towards Chennai and 5 hours 00 mins towards Bengaluru as 12028 & 12027 Shatabdi Express runs at a speed of (71.78 km/hr) in average of both directions.

Schedule 
The schedule of this 12027/12028 KSR Bengaluru - MGR Chennai Central Shatabdi Express is given below:-

Speed
Its all coaches are of air conditioned LHB coach type which is capable of reaching 160 kmph but it does not touch. Sometimes people become confused because according to Indian Railways Permanent Way Manual (IRPWM) on Indian Railways website or Indian Railway Institute of Civil Engineering website, the BG (Broad Gauge) lines have been classified into six groups ‘A’ to ‘E’ on the basis of the future maximum permissible speeds but it may not be same as present speed.

The maximum permissible speed of the train and the route is 110 kmph. SOUTH WESTERN RAILWAY (SWR) increased the speed limit of KSR Bengaluru -  Jolarpettai section to 110 kmph in 2020  .  , Maximum Permissible Speed in Chennai Central – Arakkonam Jn. (DN FAST, UP FAST), Arakkonam – Jolarpettai is 110 kmph as of 2021  but Chennai – Jolarpettai section speed to be increased to 130 kmph from 110 kmph which is yet to be implemented 
. The train will run at a maximum speed of 130 kmph in Chennai – Jolarpettai section in future after constructing infrastructure.

As per the latest news articles, this train would be converted to Vande Bharat Express starting from KSR Bengaluru City Junction to MGR Chennai Central and vice versa and this would become operational around December 2022.

Loco link
It is hauled by a WAP-7 end to end.

References 

Shatabdi Express trains
Rail transport in Karnataka
Rail transport in Tamil Nadu
Transport in Bangalore
Transport in Chennai